The men's decathlon event at the 2016 IAAF World U20 Championships was held at Zdzisław Krzyszkowiak Stadium on 19 and 20 July.

Medalists

Records

Results

Final standings

References

Decathlon
Combined events at the World Athletics U20 Championships